Homoeocera sandion is a moth of the subfamily Arctiinae. It is found in Colombia.

References

Euchromiina
Moths described in 1910